Lenz is a German surname.

Notable people with the name include:

Arts and entertainment
 Alev Lenz (born 1982), German-Turkish singer/songwriter
 Bethany Joy Lenz-Galeotti (born 1981), American television actress
 David Lenz (born 1962), American portrait painter
 Desiderius Lenz (1832–1928), German artist, Benedictine monk, co-founder of the Beuron Art School 
 Fabian Lenz, German DJ, techno musician and events producer
 Frank Lenz (born 1967), drummer from Southern California who has done work for many bands and artists
 Frederick Lenz (1950–1998), American author and Buddhist spiritual guru
 Hermann Lenz, German writer of poetry, fiction stories, and novels
 Gita Lenz (1910–2011), New York photographer
 Günter Lenz (born 1938), German jazz bassist and composer
 Jack Lenz, Canadian Bahá'í composer
 Jakob Lenz (opera), a one act chamber opera by Wolfgang Rihm
 Jakob Michael Reinhold Lenz (1751–1792), German writer of the Sturm und Drang movement
 Kay Lenz (born 1953), Emmy Award-winning American television and film actress
 Klára Lenz (1924–2013), Hungarian tapestry artist 
 Marlene Lenz (born 1932), German politician
 Maximilian Lenz (1860–1948), Austrian artist
 Maximilian Lenz (born 1965) alias WestBam, German DJ and techno musician 
 Nicole Marie Lenz (born 1980), actress
 Pedro Lenz (born 1965), Swiss writer, expert of Spanish literature 
 Rick Lenz (born 1939), American actor, author and playwright
 Rudolf Lenz (1920–1987), Austrian actor
 Sidney Lenz (1873–1960), American contract bridge player and writer
 Siegfried Lenz (1926–2014), German writer
 Uli Lenz (born 1955), German composer, pianist, and producer in the modern jazz genre
 Wilhelm von Lenz (1809–1883), Baltic German Russian official and writer

Sports
 André Lenz, retired German football goalkeeper 
 August Lenz, German international footballer
 Christopher Lenz, German footballer who plays as a defender
 Consetta Caruccio-Lenz (1918–1980), American gymnast 
 David Lenz, German Major League Baseball player
 Frank Lenz (cyclist) (1867 – probably 1894), American bicyclist and adventurer who disappeared somewhere near Erzurum, Turkey
 Gene Lenz, American competition swimmer 
 Jörn Lenz, German former footballer who played as a defender
 Josef Lenz, West German luger 
 Josh Lenz (born 1990), American football wide receiver 
 Julian Lenz, German tennis player
 Manuel Lenz (born 1984), German footballer 
 Marcel Lenz (disambiguation), several people
 Peter Lenz (1997–2010), American motorcycle road racer
 Sandy Lenz, American figure skater

Science and academia
 Fritz Lenz (1887–1976), German anthropologist and eugenicist
 Emil Lenz (1804–1865), German and Russian physicist

 Hanfried Lenz (1916–2013),  German mathematician
 Maurice Lenz (1890–1974), Russian pioneer in the field of radiation therapy
 Max Lenz (1850–1931), German historian
 Oskar Lenz (1848–1925), a German-Austrian geologist and mineralogist
 Renate Lenz-Fuchs (1910–2011), German lawyer and honorary chairman of the German Lawyer's Association
 Widukind Lenz (1919–1995), German pediatrician

 Widukind Lenz (1919–195), German pediatrician, medical geneticist and dysmorphologist 
 Wilhelm Lenz (1888–1957), German physicist

Politician 
 Andreas Lenz (born 1981), German politician
 Carl Otto Lenz (born 1930),  German lawyer, member of the German Bundestag
 Otto Lenz (1903–1957), German politician (CDU), Head of the Chancellery (1951-53), member of the German Bundestag
 Tomasz Lenz (born 1968), Polish politician

Other
 Dolly Lenz (born 1957), real estate agent in New York City
 Stephanie Lenz, plaintiff in Lenz v. Universal Music Corp. who posted a YouTube video of children dancing to a Prince song
 Hermann-Lenz-Preis, a literary prize of Germany
 Hester-Lenz House, a historic house in Benton, Arkansas
 Lenz Field, privately-owned multi-field baseball and softball complex in Jacksonville, IL

Fictional people 
 Billy Lenz, a character in the 2006 remake of Black Christmas

See also 
 Lenz, Oregon (disambiguation)
 Maximilian Lenz (disambiguation)